The  San Jose SaberCats season was the 18th season for the franchise in the Arena Football League. The team was coached by Darren Arbet and played their home games at the SAP Center at San Jose. The team was led by its league-best defense, which held eleven of its eighteen regular-season opponents to fewer than 40 points.

Standings

Schedule

Regular season
The SaberCats began the season on the road against the Portland Thunder on March 17. They played their last regular season game on the road against the Iowa Barnstormers on July 26.

Playoffs

Final roster

References

San Jose SaberCats
San Jose SaberCats seasons
San